Tawoyan may refer to:
 Tawoyan people, an ethnic group of Indonesia
 Tawoyan language, their language